"Thirty-Three" is a song by American alternative rock band the Smashing Pumpkins. It was the fifth and final single from their third album, Mellon Collie and the Infinite Sadness (1995), in November 1996. It was the first single released after the firing of Jimmy Chamberlin and death of Jonathan Melvoin. The song peaked at 39 on the US Billboard Hot 100, becoming the band's fourth and final top-40 hit there, number seven in New Zealand and the top 30 in Canada and the United Kingdom. In Canada, it coincidentally finished at number 33 on the RPM Alternative 30 year-end chart for 1997.

Background
The song was described by Billy Corgan as "a simple song in a country tuning", and was the first song that he wrote after the Siamese Dream tour. The guitars in the song are tuned to EGBGBE half a step down, and the drum machine track is exactly the same track Corgan recorded when he laid down the demo version of the song, because he was unable to recreate it.

In a taping of VH1 Storytellers on August 24, 2000, Corgan joked that he planned on making "Thirty-Three", "Sixty-Six", and "Ninety-Nine", but only finished "Thirty-Three".

When the band released their greatest hits collection in 2001, Thirty-Three made neither the international nor the US version. It was included, however, on the Greatest Hits Video Collection.

Single release
At the time of its release, the plan to release the song as the album's final single was a point of disagreement for insiders. Sources close to the band claim that "Muzzle" was in fact due to be released as the final single, as is evidenced by the fact that a promotional single for the song was issued to radio stations worldwide.

Music video
The music video for "Thirty-Three", directed both by Billy Corgan and then-girlfriend Yelena Yemchuk, is a series of images shot in stop-motion, ending with a re-enactment of the Mellon Collie album cover. Jimmy Chamberlin is notably absent from shots of the band. Although the group's videos habitually avoid the literal interpretation of a song's lyrics, the video for "Thirty-Three" was created with images closely related to the words of the song, as an intentional stylistic departure.

B-sides
The B-side "The Last Song" features a guitar solo by Corgan's father, Billy Corgan Sr. and was performed live only once, at the Pumpkins' final show at Chicago's Cabaret Metro.

The B-side "My Blue Heaven" features piano by Keith Brown, a song written in 1927 by George A. Whiting and Walter Donaldson.

Adam Schlesinger of Fountains of Wayne and Ivy fame contributed piano for the B-side "The Bells".

Track listings

Charts

Weekly charts

Year-end charts

Release history

References

External links
 

The Smashing Pumpkins songs
1995 songs
1996 singles
Hut Records singles
Rock ballads
Songs written by Billy Corgan
Song recordings produced by Alan Moulder
Song recordings produced by Billy Corgan
Song recordings produced by Flood (producer)